Alexander Ramsay (12 January 1887 – 17 October 1969) was a British Conservative Party politician.

He was elected at the 1931 general election as Member of Parliament (MP) for West Bromwich, defeating the sitting Labour MP Frederick Roberts. Ramsay did not defend the seat at the 1935 general election (when it was regained by Roberts), and did not stand for Parliament again.

References

External links 

1887 births
1969 deaths
Conservative Party (UK) MPs for English constituencies
UK MPs 1931–1935